Mirror Repair is a 1994 EP by Gastr del Sol released on Drag City. The album was written and performed by David Grubbs and Jim O'Rourke.

Track listing
 "Photographed Yawning" - 0:50 
 "Eight Corners" - 8:53
 "Dictionary Of Handwriting" – 6:02
 "Why Sleep" – 2:02
 "Mirror Repair" – 3:14

References

1994 albums
Gastr del Sol albums
Drag City (record label) albums